Lorenzo Bodega (born 11 July 1959) is an Italian politician who served as Mayor of Lecco (1997–2006), Deputy (2006–2008) and Senator (2008–2013).

References

1959 births
Living people
Mayors of Lecco
People from Lecco
Lega Nord politicians
Deputies of Legislature XV of Italy
Senators of Legislature XVI of Italy
20th-century Italian politicians
21st-century Italian politicians